UnAmerican were an English rock band based out of London. The group was fronted by former World Party member Steve McEwan.

Biography
Steve McEwan played guitar in World Party, and while in the group began working with fellow member Guy Chambers on a side project. They wrote several songs together which would later be included on UnAmerican's debut album. After Chambers left to work with Robbie Williams, McEwan recruited Matthew Crozer from a London band called Ugli, and Peter Clarke and Tim Bye from a group called Bugs. The group were signed by Estupendo Records, a Universal subsidiary, after only a few live shows. Their debut self-titled record was released early in 2000. Following the release of the album, the group toured the United States with The Who.

The group worked on a second album, but it was never released.

Members
Steve McEwan - vocals
Peter Clarke - bass
Matthew Crozer - guitar
Tim Bye - drums

References

External links
Band biography, Hip Online

English rock music groups